is a Japanese former professional boxer. He held the IBF bantamweight title from 1984 to 1985 as the inaugural champion.

Career history
After being unbeaten in 5 bouts (4 wins and a draw), Shingaki challenged Dodie Boy Penalosa for the vacant IBF light flyweight title on December 10, 1983. Unfortunate for him, he was knocked out in 12 rounds and met his first setback.

Following a win since losing to Penalosa, Shingaki got another world title shot on April 15, 1984. There, he fought Elmer Magallano for the vacant IBF bantamweight championship and won by TKO in the 8th round. He defended it against Joves De La Puz, three months and twenty days later.

On his second defense, Shingaki fought Australia's Jeff Fenech on 26 April 1985 at the Hordern Pavilion in Sydney. The Japanese champion lost title as he was stopped in the 9th round. They met again on August 23 in the same year at the State Sports Centre, again in Sydney where once more, Shingaki was beaten, this time in 3 rounds. Fenech connected with a hard right 30 seconds into the first which had blood coming from Shingaki's nose. In the 2nd Fenech again connected and opened up a bad cut above his opponents right eye. In true Japanese tradition Shingaki never gave up but the fight was stopped after 3 rounds after he was ruled unfit to continue. Shingaki, despite his injury was keen to continue, even shaping up showing he was willing to go on, but the doctor and referee wouldn't budge and the fight was over.

He won his last 3 matches and quit boxing permanently.

Professional boxing record

See also
List of bantamweight boxing champions
List of IBF world champions
List of Japanese boxing world champions
Boxing in Japan

External links
 

1964 births
Living people
Bantamweight boxers
International Boxing Federation champions
Southpaw boxers
People from Okinawa Island
Japanese male boxers
World bantamweight boxing champions